The Eagle Talon is a two-door 2+2, front-wheel drive (FWD) or all-wheel drive (AWD) hatchback coupé manufactured and marketed from 1989 until 1998 and sold by Eagle along with rebadged variants the Plymouth Laser and Mitsubishi Eclipse.

The last year for the Eagle Talon—as well as the Eagle division of Chrysler—was 1998.

Characteristics
The Talon, Laser and Eclipse were badge variants using the Chrysler D platform, manufactured at the DSM (Diamond Star Motors joint venture between Chrysler and Mitsubishi) manufacturing plant in Normal, Illinois. All three vehicles were mechanically identical (when comparing the same option level) including engine, transmission, and drivetrain. 

Cosmetically, differences between the three were found in wheels, availability of colors, taillights, front and rear bumpers, and spoilers. The Talon featured two-tone body color with a black 'greenhouse' (roof, pillars, door-mounted mirrors) regardless of the body color. The variants featured 5-speed manual or 4-speed automatic transmissions and a hood bulge on the left-hand side of the car for camshaft clearance when equipped with the 4G63 engine. The base model DL did not use this engine, but still had a bulge in the hood. All second generation cars had such a bulge, even when fitted with the 420A engine which did not require the additional clearance.

First generation (1990–94)

The first-generation Talon was released in mid-1989 as a 1990 model and ran through 1994. This era of DSM vehicles is commonly referred to as the first generation, or "1G" for short. However, there were two 1G styles. The "1GA" models of 1990–1991 featured pop-up headlights and a "6-bolt" engine, while the "1GB" model of 1992–1994 featured composite style headlights with integrated turn signals and a "7-bolt" engine.

The 1993–1994 base model DL was front-wheel drive and used a 92-horsepower 1.8 L engine (4G37). The ES model (or just the base Talon before 1993) sported a naturally aspirated 2.0 L 135 hp Mitsubishi 4G63 engine. The front-drive TSi produced only 190 hp due to a more restrictive exhaust system, and the automatics produced  due to a 13g turbo.

The "6-bolt" engine on all Talons built before April 1992 refers to the number of bolts connecting the flywheel to the crankshaft. All 1G Talons built after April 1992 received a freer revving "7-bolt" engine borrowed from the 1992 Mitsubishi Lancer Evolution's lighter rods and 7-bolt crankshaft.

1G trim levels
base – 1990–1992
TSi FWD Turbo – 1990–1994
TSi AWD Turbo – 1990–1994
DL – 1993–1994
ES – 1993–1994

Production numbers
 1990: 32,708
 1991: 33,537
 1992: 27,945
 1993: 26,740
 1994: 24,040

Awards
The Talon Turbo was on Car and Driver magazine's Ten Best list for the years 1989 through 1992.

Second generation (1995–98)

The second-generation (or "2G") Eagle Talon was introduced in 1995 simultaneously with its Mitsubishi Eclipse counterpart, while the Plymouth Laser model was eliminated. Mechanically, the new Talon and Eclipse models were almost identical with the engines in the turbocharged versions receiving a modest increase in output thanks to a redesigned intake and exhaust, higher 8.5:1 (vs. 7.8:1) compression pistons, and new turbocharger. The T25 did spool up faster than the previous turbocharger in order to increase the turbo response or reduce turbo lag. The other important change concerned the suspension. While the 1G had MacPherson struts in the front, the 2G had double-wishbone in the front and multilink suspension in the rear. The double-wishbone suspension gave the 2G a much better roll-camber curve in the front, allowing for much better handling.

From an aesthetic standpoint, the differences between the Eagle Talon and its Mitsubishi equivalent were somewhat more substantial than exhibited in the first generation models. These differences were most obvious at the rear of the car. For example, the rear fascia of the Talon featured a bumper cap with a dip in the middle to allow for a high-mounted rear license plate; rear light clusters incorporating amber turn signals (the Eclipse used red turn signals); reverse lights as part of the main rear tail light clusters (the Eclipse's reverse lights were mounted separately and lower around the mid-mounted license plate); and a sickle-shaped rear spoiler for the TSi and TSi AWD version mounted at the base of the rear window that was painted black regardless of body color (the Eclipse used a body-colored, conventional "basket handle" spoiler mounted on the rear deck). ESi models (non-turbo) did not receive side skirts, while TSi and TSi AWD models received side skirts that had the words "16V DOHC TURBO" embossed on the sections behind the doors and ahead of the rear wheels. Minor differences in the front bumper included the lack of a body-colored splitter in the central air intake compared to the Eclipse, slightly differently shaped fog lamps, and the entire air intake section was recessed into the bumper cover compared to the flush intakes of the Eclipse. The Talon featured a black roof while the Eclipse had a body-colored top. Lastly, the "Eagle" and either "ESi", "TSi", or "TSi AWD" badges were embossed, body-colored plastic that were glued to the rear bumper below the taillights on the Talon, while the Eclipse used simple stickers placed on the hatch to denote make and trim level.

For the model year 1997, a design update occurred for both the Talon and the Eclipse that is sometimes referred to as "2Gb". The update was primarily limited to the non-metal portions of the car. The front and rear fascias were heavily revised to incorporate more aggressive-looking features. At the front, a larger air intake was created and the "Eagle" emblem was enlarged and embossed into the center of the bumper cap (as opposed to a badge that inset into a similarly shaped hole). At the rear, a new high-mount spoiler was introduced that projected further into the airstream, replacing the flush-mounted sickle spoiler. Side skirts were dropped from TSi and TSi AWD models, but the words "16V DOHC TURBO" were added as embossed lettering in the same location between the doors and rear wheels. All badging on the sides and rear of the car was now changed to contrasting colors instead of body-colored. Added plastic moldings on the bumper caps and doors completed the revisions to the body.

The TSi and TSi AWD models again featured an intercooled turbocharged engine, now replacing the 14B Mitsubishi turbo with a Garrett T25 model. Although the T25 was a smaller turbo, it spooled faster at a lower rpm resulting in increased low-end acceleration performance. The TSi AWD model retained the all-wheel drive drivetrain system.

Engines

Standard equipment

ESi: 2.0 liter DOHC 4-cylinder engine, 5-speed manual transmission, 4-wheel disc brakes, driver and passenger airbags, variable-assist power steering, cloth reclining front bucket seats, folding rear seat, front console with storage and armrest, tinted glass, tachometer, coolant temperature gauge, trip odometer, map lights, dual remote mirrors, visor mirrors, AM/FM radio, digital clock, remote fuel door and hatch releases, tilt steering column, intermittent wipers, rear wiper/washer, rear spoiler, color-keyed bodyside moldings, 195/70R14 tires, and wheel covers.

TSi adds: turbocharged engine, sport-tuned exhaust system, upgraded suspension, driver's seat lumbar support adjustment, split-folding rear seat, leather-wrapped steering wheel and manual gearshift handle, power mirrors, turbo boost and oil pressure gauges, cassette player, lighted visor mirrors, rear defogger, cargo-area cover, cargo net, lower bodyside cladding, fog lamps, 205/55/R16 tires, and alloy wheels.

TSi AWD adds: permanent all-wheel drive, cruise control, power door locks and windows, 215/55/VR16 tires.

Optional equipment
Eagle offered various option packages as well as optional equipment that could be added individually.

Option Packages:

Pkg 21B/22B, ESi: Air conditioning, cruise control, rear defogger, power mirrors, cassette player, cargo area cover, front floor mats. Pkg 22B requires 4-speed automatic transmission.
Pkg 21C/22C, ESi: Pkg 21B/22B plus power windows and door locks, cargo net, upgraded interior trim. Pkg 22C requires 4-speed automatic transmission.
Pkg 23P/24P, TSi: Air conditioning, cruise control, power windows and door locks, front floor mats. Pkg 24P requires automatic transmission.
Pkg 25S/26S, TSi AWD: Air conditioning, front floor mats. Pkg 26S requires automatic transmission.
Pkg 25L/26L, TSi AWD: Pkg 25S/26S plus power driver's seat, leather/vinyl front upholstery, CD/cassette player with graphic equalizer, power sunroof, remote keyless entry with a security alarm. Pkg 26L requires automatic transmission.

Optional Equipment:

4-speed automatic transmission, ESi, TSi, TSi AWD. TSi AWD includes 205/55/VR16 tires.
Anti-lock brakes
Limited-slip differential, TSi AWD
Air Conditioning
Remote keyless entry with security alarm, ESi w/ Pkg 21C/22C, and TSi AWD w/ Pkg 25S/26S.
Rear defogger, ESi
Cassette/CD Player, ESi w/ Pkg 21C/22C, TSi w/ option pkg, TSi AWD w/ Pkg 25S/26S. Credit back w/ pkg 25L/26L
Cassette/CD player with graphic equalizer (includes 8 Infinity speakers,) TSi w/ option pkg, TSi AWD w/ Pkg 25S/26S.
Power sunroof, ESi w/ Pkg 21C/22C
Leather/vinyl upholstery, TSi w/ option pkg and TSi AWD w/ Pkg 25S/26S
Power driver's seat, TSi w/ option pkg or TSi AWD w/ Pkg. 25S/26S
Homelink, requires option pkg. (96–98 only)
Alloy wheels, ESi w/ option pkg.

Production numbers
 1995: 25,066
 1996: 15,100
 1997: 9,788
 1998: 4,308

End of the Talon
By 1998, the Talon was the last model in the declining Eagle lineup and the rarest Talon model year. Amid declining sales, Chrysler management decided to stop promoting the Eagle brand. The last Eagle Talon rolled off the assembly line on February 10, 1998.

Eagle Jazz
In 1994, a concept car called the Eagle Jazz was developed for the 1995 automobile show circuit. "It was a sporty sedan with a rounded hatchback tail. Built into that was a hatch-within-a-hatch, so a driver could easily open the rear end to store cargo." It was considered by some to have "a strange resemblance to a 4-door Eagle Talon". Some of the Eagle Jazz concept designs and ideas resurfaced in the second-generation Chrysler Concorde.

Motorsport
The Talon won the SCCA World Challenge touring car championship from 1990 to 1991 and the GT Touring championship from 1993 to 1995. Along with Oldsmobile (Achieva '92-'94), Eagle is one of only two American brands to win the TC championship in the 1990s. As of 2020, GM's Oldsmobile Achieva and Chevy Sonic (TCB) have accomplished this feat, along with Chrysler's Eagle Talon. The Dodge Shelby Charger won SSA of the predecessor SCCA / Escort Endurance Championship in 1986, and its Eagle Talon won SSA in 1989.

Legacy
The TSi nameplate appeared on Jeep's Grand Cherokee for the 1997 and 1998 model years. It was marketed as a sportier model in the line-up (with the exception of the 5.9 Limited) and featured Indigo blue trim and monochromatic scheme that was available on the Talon. The TSi name reappeared again, as a high-performance model for the Chrysler Sebring sedan, for the 2005 and 2006 model years. Previously to the introduction of the Talon, the TSi nameplate was used on the 1986-1989 Dodge/Plymouth/Chrysler Conquest (wide body model only).

See also
Mitsubishi Eclipse
Plymouth Laser
Diamond-Star Motors

References

External links
Eagle Talon TSI review
Eclipse/Laser/Talon website featuring help and info

Talon
Compact cars
Front-wheel-drive sports cars
All-wheel-drive vehicles
Hatchbacks
Coupés
Sport compact cars
Police vehicles
1990s cars
Cars introduced in 1989
Cars discontinued in 1998